Naif Ali Al-Qadi (born 3 April 1979) is a Saudi Arabian former football (soccer) player who last played as a defender for Al-Shabab.

He played for the Saudi Arabia national team occasionally and was called up to the squad to participate in the 2006 FIFA World Cup.

References

1979 births
Living people
Saudi Arabian footballers
Saudi Arabia international footballers
2004 AFC Asian Cup players
2006 FIFA World Cup players
Al-Rayyan SC players
Al-Ahli Saudi FC players
Al-Shabab FC (Riyadh) players
Saudi Arabian expatriate footballers
Sportspeople from Mecca
Association football defenders
Saudi Professional League players
Qatar Stars League players
Expatriate footballers in Qatar
Saudi Arabian expatriate sportspeople in Qatar